Casey Creehan is an American gridiron football coach. He is a special teams and offensive assistant coach for the Hamilton Tiger-Cats of the Canadian Football League (CFL). Creehan served as the head football coach at Lyon College in Batesville, Arkansas from 2018 to 2019 and Peru State College in Peru, Nebraska from 2020 to 2021. He previously served as an assistant coach with several teams in the CFL.

Personal life
Creehan is the son of Dennis Creehan.

Head coaching record

References

External links
 Peru State profile
 Lyon profile

Year of birth missing (living people)
Living people
American football linebackers
Calgary Stampeders coaches
Clarion Golden Eagles football coaches
Eastern Michigan Eagles football coaches
Edmonton Elks coaches
Grove City Wolverines football players
Hamilton Tiger-Cats coaches
James Madison Dukes football coaches
Lehigh Mountain Hawks football coaches
Lyon Scots football coaches
Montreal Alouettes coaches
Peru State Bobcats football coaches
Southern Illinois Salukis football coaches
Toronto Argonauts coaches
Winnipeg Blue Bombers coaches